Houghton Rangers F.C. is a football club based in Leicestershire, England. A club of the same name played in the FA Cup in 1949, but this was from Bedfordshire and the two clubs are not related.

Honours
Leicestershire Senior League Division One
Champions 1990–91
Runners-up 2013–14

Records

References

External links

Football clubs in England
Leicester and District Football League
Football clubs in Leicestershire